David John Ewins FRS FREng (25 March 1942 – 25 January 2023) was a British mechanical engineer. He was Director of the Bristol Laboratory for Advanced Dynamics Engineering (BLADE) at University of Bristol from 2007 to 2015.

Life and career
Ewins studied mechanical engineering at Imperial College London, and studied for a PhD at the University of Cambridge. He was Professor of Vibration Engineering at Imperial College London.

Ewins was acting director of the AgustaWestland UTC.

Ewins was appointed a Fellow of the Royal Academy of Engineering and Fellow of the Royal Society in 2006.

Ewins was appointed a Fellow of the Society for Experimental Mechanics in 2014.

Ewins died on 25 January 2023, at the age of 80.

References

External links
https://web.archive.org/web/20111020144743/http://www.sem.org/PDF/XXX_Honorary.pdf

1942 births
2023 deaths
British mechanical engineers
Academics of the University of Bristol
Alumni of Imperial College London
Fellows of the Royal Society
Fellows of the Society for Experimental Mechanics